Martha Evelina Mercader (February 27, 1926 – February 17, 2010) was an Argentine politician and writer, known for novels, short stories, essays and children's books.

Mercader was born in La Plata, Argentina, in 1926. She died on February 17, 2010, in Buenos Aires at the age of 83.

References

1926 births
2010 deaths
Argentine essayists
Argentine women novelists
People from La Plata
20th-century Argentine women politicians
20th-century Argentine politicians
20th-century Argentine women writers
20th-century Argentine writers
Argentine women essayists
20th-century Argentine novelists
20th-century essayists